Joel Dufter (born 18 March 1995) is a German male speed skater. He represented Germany at the 2018 Winter Olympics and competed in the men's 500m event eventually finishing at 29th position. Prior to the Olympic debut, he has participated at the 2015–16 ISU Speed Skating World Cup competing in different events.

He holds the German national record along with Nico Ihle and Hubert Hirschbichler in the men's team sprint event, which was set during the 2015–16 ISU Speed Skating World Cup on 22 November 2015.

Speed skating

Personal records

Tournament overview

Source German data:

World Cup overview

 NC = No classification
 – = Did not participate
 (b) = Division B
 DQ = Disqualified
 DNQ = Did not qualify for final distance

References 

1995 births
Living people
German male speed skaters
Speed skaters at the 2018 Winter Olympics
Speed skaters at the 2022 Winter Olympics
Olympic speed skaters of Germany
People from Traunstein
Sportspeople from Upper Bavaria